The men's épée was one of seven fencing events on the fencing at the 1956 Summer Olympics programme. It was the twelfth appearance of the event. The competition was held on 30 November 1956. 41 fencers from 18 nations competed. Nations were limited to three fencers each. The event was won by Carlo Pavesi of Italy, the nation's fifth consecutive victory in the men's épée (most among all nations, above France with three). In all five of those Games, Italy earned at least two medals in the event; this was the second sweep during that period for Italy (and fifth overall, with Cuba achieving that once and France twice). Giuseppe Delfino was the silver medalist while Edoardo Mangiarotti took bronze. It was Mangiarotti's third medal in the event, along with gold in 1952 and another bronze in 1948; he was the first man to win three medals in the individual épée.

Background

This was the 12th appearance of the event, which was not held at the first Games in 1896 (with only foil and sabre events held) but has been held at every Summer Olympics since 1900.

Five of the 10 finalists from the 1952 Games returned: gold medalist (and 1948 bronze medalist) Edoardo Mangiarotti of Italy, fifth-place finisher József Sákovics of Hungary, sixth-place finisher Carlo Pavesi of Italy, seventh-place finisher Per Carleson of Sweden, and eighth-place finisher Carl Forssell of Sweden. The reigning (1955) World Champion, Giorgio Anglesio of Italy, was on the Italian team for the team event but did not compete in the individual event, with Mangiarotti (a two-time World Champion as well as two-time Olympic medalist), Pavesi, and Giuseppe Delfino making up the nation's heavily favored three-man squad for the individual competition.

Indonesia made its debut in the event. East and West Germany competed together as the United Team of Germany for the first time. Belgium and the United States each appeared for the 11th time, tied for most among nations.

Competition format

The competition used a pool play format, with each fencer facing the other fencers in the pool in a round robin. For the first time, bouts were to 5 touches. Barrages were used to break ties necessary for advancement (touches against were the first tie-breaker used to give ranks when the rank did not matter). However, only as much fencing was done as was necessary to determine advancement, so some bouts never occurred if the fencers advancing from the pool could be determined. The smaller field resulted in fewer pools and smaller pools (the final was only 8 fencers for the first time since 1912, after decades at 10 or 12 fencers).

Fencers from the four nations that reached the team event final received byes to the quarterfinals.

 Round 1: 4 pools of 7 or 8 fencers each. The top 4 fencers in each pool advanced to the quarterfinals.
 Quarterfinals: 4 pools of 7 fencers each. The top 4 fencers in each pool advanced to the semifinals. 
 Semifinals: 2 pools of 8 fencers each. The top 4 fencers in each pool advanced to the final.
 Final: 1 pool of 8 fencers.

Schedule

All times are Australian Eastern Standard Time (UTC+10)

Results

Round 1

The top 4 fencers in each pool advanced to the quarterfinals. Fencers from the four teams that advanced to the final of the men's team épée event received byes through round 1:
 France: Daniel Dagallier, Armand Mouyal, and René Queyroux
 Great Britain: Bill Hoskyns, Michael Howard, and Allan Jay
 Hungary: Lajos Balthazár, Béla Rerrich, and József Sákovics
 Italy: Giuseppe Delfino, Edoardo Mangiarotti, and Carlo Pavesi

Pool 1

Pool 2

Pool 3

Pool 4

Quarterfinals

The top 4 fencers in each pool advanced to the semifinals.

Quarterfinal 1

Quarterfinal 2

Quarterfinal 3

Quarterfinal 4

Semifinals

The top 4 fencers in each pool advanced to the final.

Semifinal 1

Semifinal 2

Final

The three-way tie among the Italian fencers for the medals at 5–2 required a barrage to settle. The first barrage resulted in another three-way tie at 1–1 (Pavesi defeated Delfino; Delfino defeated Mangiarotti; Mangiarotti defeated Pavesi). In the second barrage, the results were the same except Pavesi defeated Mangiarotti to win the gold medal. Delfino took silver and Mangiarotti bronze. In all, Mangiarotti had faced Delfino 4 times (Mangiarotti winning in the semifinal pool, Delfino winning three times: the final pool and both barrages), Delfino had faced Pavesi 3 times (Pavesi winning all 3 in the final pool and both barrages), and Pavesi had faced Mangiarotti 3 times (Mangiarotti winning in the final pool and first barrage, Pavesi winning in the second barrage).

References

Epee men
Men's events at the 1956 Summer Olympics